Sipe Springs (pronounced "seep") is an unincorporated community located in Comanche County, in the U.S. state of Texas. According to the Handbook of Texas, the community had a population of 75 in 2000.

History
The area in what is known as Sipe Springs today was first settled around 1870. The community itself was not organized until 1873. It was named for the nearby springs that appeared to "seep" out of rock formations. The community had its own Baptist and Methodist churches, as well as a United Brethren congregation. A post office was established at Sipe Springs in 1883. That next year, it had a population of 130 served by five general stores, two hotels, and two combination gin-gristmills. A local newspaper titled the Cyclone was published in 1890. Phone service began in 1909. The Texas Central Railroad built a track from De Leon to Cross Plains in 1911. Its right of way ran through the area north of the community. This spouted the town's growth. It had 500 residents, had a bank, and a newspaper titled the Sipe Springs Record in 1914. When oil was discovered in Sipe Springs in 1918, it caused the community to grow into a large city of about 8,000 people. Its businesses included hotels, rooming houses, drugstores, barbershops, cafes, another bank, a cotton gin, a movie theater and a dance hall. Unfortunately, the boom looked to be temporary, as the oil deposits in oilfields were shallow. Both banks closed in 1921, and that next year, a fire ravaged the community. Its population plunged to 575, which was higher than the pre-boom figure, in 1924. Its decline continued into the 1930s when the water supply dwindled, hurting local farms. Sipe Springs had 200 residents and 12 businesses in 1940. The population went down to 120 in 1949 and lost ten more residents in 1974. It had a cemetery and several scattered houses in 1987. Its population was 75 from 1988 through 2000.

Sipe Springs also had an opera house and its own baseball team.

Geography

Education
Sipe Springs' first school was established in 1873. Another school was built in 1922. Both schools had a combination of 152 students and six teachers. They continued to operate in 1940 until it was divided between the Sidney and De Leon Independent School Districts. Today, the community is served by the De Leon ISD.

References

Unincorporated communities in Comanche County, Texas
Unincorporated communities in Texas